Sompong Soleb (born 30 July 1986), simply known as Pong is a Thai professional footballer who plays as a forward for Sukhothai. He debuted for the senior Thailand national football team in 2010.

He played in the 2010 Thai League Cup final and won a winner's medal after Thai Port defeated Buriram PEA F.C. 2–1.

Back in 2004, Sompong Soleb was one of three Thais selected from over 500 hopefuls to spend a year training with Everton F.C. The selection process was part of a reality TV show funded by Everton's main sponsor Chang Beer, with Everton's youth academy director Ray Hall helping judge the competition.

Club career

His career began with third division side Satun United F.C. In 2004, he participated in a football talent show. The main prize was a nine-month stay in the youth academy of the English club Everton F.C. Together with Rattapol Piyavutiskul and Teerathep Winothai he won this award. In April 2005, he took part in a three weeks trial at Chester City. The club was also willing to give him a contract. but it probably came from labor reasons for any contract with the club. Back in Thailand, he played until the end of 2006 for his hometown club before he moved to Thai League 1 side Port Authority in 2007. He scored only four goals in 22 matches of the 2008 season and left to Chula United F.C., for whom he plays ever since. In his first season, he scored nine goals for Chula.

After missing two easy chances in the game against Samut Songkhram FC he is known by Thai fans as "Thai Welbeck".

International career

He won the gold medal with Thailand at the 2007 Southeast Asian Games. He also played in the 2009 Southeast Asian Games. He also took part in the 2007 Summer Universiade, hosted in Thailand and won bronze. In October 2011, Sompong scored in a match against Oman in the third round of 2014 FIFA World Cup qualification. He also played in two AFF Cups in 2012 and 2014.

International

International goals

Honours

Club
Thai Port
 Thai FA Cup (1): 2009
 Thai League Cup (1): 2010

Buriram
 Thai Division 1 League (1): 2011

International
Thailand
 ASEAN Football Championship (1): 2014
Thailand U-23
 Sea Games  Gold Medal (1); 2007

References

External links
 Profile at Goal
 

1986 births
Living people
Sompong Soleb
Sompong Soleb
Sompong Soleb
Sompong Soleb
Association football forwards
Sompong Soleb
Sompong Soleb
Sompong Soleb
Sompong Soleb
Sompong Soleb
Sompong Soleb
Sompong Soleb
Sompong Soleb
Sompong Soleb
Sompong Soleb
Southeast Asian Games medalists in football
Sompong Soleb
Competitors at the 2007 Southeast Asian Games
Thai expatriate sportspeople in the United Kingdom